The Aryan Path was an Anglo-Indian theosophical journal published in Bombay, India, between 1930 and 1960. Its purpose was to form "a nucleus of universal brotherhood of humanity, without distinction of race, creed, sex, caste or color; to study ancient and modern religions, philosophies, and sciences, and to demonstrate the importance of such study". The magazine's first editor was B. P. Wadia. It was published on a bimonthly basis by a group called the Theosophy Company, which distributed copies of the magazine to London.

History and profile
The Aryan Path was founded in  January 1930. In its first edition, a writer named "Shravaka" emphasised that so much "original" writing is done today, so much "self-expression" is indulged in that, in the glamour that is raised, the chants of the Gods remain unheard. One of our tasks is to bring home the truth that it is not derogatory to respect the old age facts of the science of the soul. 

The Aryan Path  was published in English on a monthly basis. The journal  contained a variety of articles on Hindu and Buddhist spiritual traditions, as well as essays on English literature, Ruskinian socialism, aesthetics and science. The journal's contributors included C. E. M. Joad, John Middleton Murry, A. E. Waite, Ramananda Chatterjee, Edmond Holmes, Max Plowman,  J. D. Beresford, Hugh I'Anson Fausset, Hugh de Sélincourt, Humbert Wolfe and Gertrude Emerson Sen. The March 1930 issue carried an essay on reincarnation by Algernon Blackwood.

The March 1932 issue carried the article "Goethe and the East" by Otto Schrader, described by The Spectator magazine as "timely and interesting".

Black American scholars such as Alain Locke and William Harrison also contributed to this journal.
The magazine ran several articles criticising racism.

After 1933 the magazine received considerable correspondence concerning the rise of Nazism, which the journal strongly opposed. In 1938 The Aryan Path ran an article condemning fascism and Nazism by G. D. H. Cole.

In 1952 The Aryan Path ran a series of articles on the Bon religion of Tibet by René de Nebesky-Wojkowitz.

The articles of this journal have been quoted in discussions about race relations, Indian civilization and English literature.

The Aryan Path ceased publication in 1960.

References

External links
 WorldCat record

1930 establishments in India
1960 disestablishments in India
Defunct literary magazines
Defunct magazines published in India
English-language magazines published in India
Literary magazines published in India
Monthly magazines published in India
Magazines about spirituality
Magazines established in 1930
Magazines disestablished in 1960
Mass media in Mumbai
Philosophy magazines